Methylmethcathinone may refer to:

 3-Methylmethcathinone
 Mephedrone (4-methylmethcathinone)